Charles Haden may refer to:

 Charlie Haden (1937–2014), American jazz musician
 Charles Harold Haden II (1937–2004), United States federal judge
 Charles Thomas Haden, father of Sir Francis Seymour Haden
 Charles Haden, fictional character portrayed by Jack Huston in Miss Austen Regrets

See also
 Charles Hayden (disambiguation)